The 89th New York State Legislature, consisting of the New York State Senate and the New York State Assembly, met from January 2 to April 20, 1866, during the second year of Reuben E. Fenton's governorship, in Albany.

Background
Under the provisions of the New York Constitution of 1846, 32 Senators and 128 assemblymen were elected in single-seat districts; senators for a two-year term, assemblymen for a one-year term. The senatorial districts were made up of entire counties, except New York County (four districts) and Kings County (two districts). The Assembly districts were made up of entire towns, or city wards, forming a contiguous area, all within the same county.

At this time there were two major political parties: the Republican Party and the Democratic Party.

Elections
The 1865 New York state election was held on November 7. All ten statewide elective offices up for election were carried by the Republicans. The approximate party strength at this election, as expressed by the vote for Secretary of State, was: Republicans 301,000 and Democrats 273,000.

Sessions
The Legislature met for the regular session at the Old State Capitol in Albany on January 2, 1866; and adjourned on April 20.

Lyman Tremain (R) was elected Speaker with 88 votes against 33 for Smith M. Weed (D).

On January 29, DeWitt C. Littlejohn (R) was elected Speaker pro tempore of the Assembly.

On February 6, Charles J. Folger (R) was re-elected President pro tempore of the State Senate.

On February 16, the Legislature elected Benjamin F. Manierre (R) to succeed William McMurray (D) on March 1 as a Metropolitan Police Commissioner.

On April 16, the Legislature re-apportioned the Assembly seats per county. Allegany, Chenango, Herkimer, Jefferson, Livingston, Steuben and Suffolk counties lost one seat each; Erie County gained one seat, Kings County gained two seats; and New York County gained four seats.

On April 25, the Legislature re-apportioned the Senate districts.

The State Senate met for a special session on June 12; adjourned on June 15; met again on August 28; and adjourned again on August 31. This session was called to hold the trial of George W. Smith, Judge of the Oneida County Court. The trial continued during the next session, and Smith was removed from office on January 25, 1867.

State Senate

Districts

 1st District: Queens, Richmond and Suffolk counties
 2nd District: 1st, 2nd, 3rd, 4th, 5th, 7th, 11th, 13th and 19th wards of the City of Brooklyn
 3rd District: 6th, 8th, 9th, 10th, 12th, 14th, 15th, 16th, 17th and 18th wards of the City of Brooklyn; and all towns in Kings County
 4th District: 1st, 2nd, 3rd, 4th, 5th, 6th, 7th, 8th and 14th wards of New York City
 5th District: 10th, 11th, 13th and 17th wards of New York City
 6th District: 9th, 15th, 16th and 18th wards of New York City
 7th District: 12th, 19th, 20th, 21st and 22nd wards of New York City
 8th District: Putnam, Rockland and Westchester counties
 9th District: Orange and Sullivan counties
 10th District: Greene and Ulster counties
 11th District: Columbia and Dutchess counties
 12th District: Rensselaer and Washington counties
 13th District: Albany County
 14th District: Delaware, Schenectady  and Schoharie counties
 15th District: Fulton, Hamilton, Montgomery and Saratoga counties
 16th District: Clinton, Essex and Warren counties
 17th District: Franklin and St. Lawrence counties
 18th District: Jefferson and Lewis counties
 19th District: Oneida County
 20th District: Herkimer and Otsego counties
 21st District: Oswego County
 22nd District: Onondaga County
 23rd District: Chenango, Cortland and Madison counties
 24th District: Broome, Tompkins and Tioga counties
 25th District: Cayuga and Wayne counties
 26th District: Ontario, Seneca and Yates counties
 27th District: Chemung, Schuyler and Steuben counties
 28th District: Monroe County
 29th District: Genesee, Niagara and Orleans counties
 30th District: Allegany, Livingston and Wyoming counties
 31st District: Erie County
 32nd District: Cattaraugus and Chautauqua counties

Note: There are now 62 counties in the State of New York. The counties which are not mentioned in this list had not yet been established, or sufficiently organized, the area being included in one or more of the abovementioned counties.

Members
The asterisk (*) denotes members of the previous Legislature who continued in office as members of this Legislature. Charles Stanford changed from the Assembly to the Senate.

Employees
 Clerk: James Terwilliger
 Sergeant-at-Arms: Arthur Hotchkiss
 Assistant Sergeant-at-Arms: Sanders Wilson
 Doorkeeper: Herman B. Young
 First Assistant Doorkeeper: Frank M. Jones
 Second Assistant Doorkeeper: Nathaniel Saxton
 Third Assistant Doorkeeper: August Wagner

State Assembly

Assemblymen
The asterisk (*) denotes members of the previous Legislature who continued as members of this Legislature.

Party affiliations follow the vote for Speaker and Police Commissioner.

Employees
 Clerk:  Joseph B. Cushman
 Sergeant-at-Arms: Frederick T. Hempstead
 Doorkeeper: S. P. Remington
 First Assistant Doorkeeper: Alexander Frier
 Second Assistant Doorkeeper: Oscar K. Dean

Notes

Sources
 The New York Civil List compiled by Franklin Benjamin Hough, Stephen C. Hutchins and Edgar Albert Werner (1870; see pg. 439 for Senate districts; pg. 444 for senators; pg. 450–463 for Assembly districts; and pg. 504f for assemblymen)
 Journal of the Senate (89th Session) (1866)
 Journal of the Assembly (89th Session) (1866; Vol. I)
 Journal of the Assembly (89th Session) (1866; Vol. II)
 Journal of Proceedings of the Senate in the Matter of George W. Smith, Judge of Oneida County, in Relation to Charges Submitted to the Senate by the Governor (1867)

089
1866 in New York (state)
1866 U.S. legislative sessions